Raegma  is a village in Muhu Parish, Saare County in western Estonia.
Its geographical coordinates are 58° 33' 44" North, 23° 18' 5" East and its original name (with diacritics) is Räegma.

References

 

Villages in Saare County